The speckle-faced parrot has been split into the following species:
 Plum-crowned parrot, Pionus tumultuosus
 White-capped parrot,  Pionus seniloides